Matthew "Matty" Ashurst (born 1 November 1989) is an English professional rugby league footballer who plays as a  forward for Wakefield Trinity in the Betfred Super League.

He has played for St Helens and the Salford Red Devils in the Super League.

Background
Ashurst was born in Wigan, Greater Manchester, England.

Career
Ashurst made his first-team début for St. Helens in a 38–12 win over Salford in round 5 of 2009's Super League XIV, where he came off the substitutes' bench. It turned out to be a break through year for the St Helens Academy product, with Ashurst making 20 appearances for the St Helens R.F.C. first team, 15 of which came off the substitutes bench. He scored one try in these games. In 2010, his first team opportunities were far from halted, in fact enhanced thanks to injuries, and Ashurst managed to find the line much more than in his début year.

References

External links

Wakefield Trinity profile
SL profile
Saints Heritage Society profile

1989 births
Living people
English rugby league players
Rugby league players from Wigan
Rugby league second-rows
Salford Red Devils players
St Helens R.F.C. players
Wakefield Trinity captains
Wakefield Trinity players